Yuliya Mikhailovna Ledovskaya (born 22 June 1991)  is a Russian rugby player. She was  three times bronze medalist of the European Championship, and won a gold medal at the 2017 Rugby Europe Sevens Grand Prix Series.

Career 
She played for the clubs TsSP (now RTsSP for IVS) and RGUTIS-Podmoskovye. As part of the Russian rugby union team, she played at the European Championship (aka European Cup) in 2014, 2015 and 2016, where she won a bronze medalist. As part of the rugby sevens team, she trained and competedt in the World Series. She competed  at the home stage of the 2017 European Championship, and became the European champion. 

She currently works as a trainer.

References 

Living people
1991 births
Russian rugby union players
Russian rugby sevens players